Moacyr Filho Domingos Demiquei (born 24 October 1981 in Rio Pardo, Brazil) is a Brazilian footballer who play as central midfielder or left midfielder.

Career

C.D. Necaxa
On 15 August 2010, Moacyr made his debut in the Liga Nacional de Futbol de Honduras with Necaxa against Real España in a 1–2 win.

Career statistic

Honours

Clubs
Necaxa
Liga Nacional de Ascenso: 2009–10 C

External links
FAS Profile

1981 births
Living people
Brazilian footballers
Brazilian expatriate footballers
CR Flamengo footballers
Club San José players
C.D. Suchitepéquez players
C.D. FAS footballers
Deportes La Serena footballers
Hispano players
Platense F.C. players
Expatriate footballers in Chile
Expatriate footballers in Bolivia
Expatriate footballers in El Salvador
Expatriate footballers in Guatemala
Expatriate footballers in Honduras
Liga Nacional de Fútbol Profesional de Honduras players
Association football midfielders
Brazilian expatriate sportspeople in Chile
Brazilian expatriate sportspeople in Bolivia
Brazilian expatriate sportspeople in El Salvador
Brazilian expatriate sportspeople in Guatemala
Brazilian expatriate sportspeople in Honduras